{{DISPLAYTITLE:C17H20N2S}}
The molecular formula C17H20N2S (molar mass: 284.42 g/mol, exact mass: 284.1347 u) may refer to:

 Isopromethazine
 Promazine
 Promethazine
 Tienopramine

Molecular formulas